Syed Zulfiqar Ali Shah Jamote (15 April 1941, in Matiari - 11 March 2011, in Karachi) was a two-time Senator and Federal Minister from Sindh, Pakistan. At the time of his death he was the leader of the Pakistan Muslim League (F).

Family
Jamote hailed from Matiari. He was married and had three children.

Career

Senator
Jamote served as senator from 1985 to 1994 and then from 1991 to 1997. While there he served as the chairman of a number of standing committees including defence, foreign affairs, and labour.

Minister
He served as Federal Minister for Population Welfare during the interim government in 1993.

PML-F
Jamote served as President of PML-F.

Other activities
Jamote served as President of the Safari and Outdoor Club of Pakistan.

Death
Jamote died at a private hospital in Karachi. He was buried in Matiari where his funeral was attended by a large number of people. Shops in Matiari, Oderolal station, Tajpur, Allah Dino Saand and Shahpur Chakar remained closed out of respect.

References

1941 births
2011 deaths
Jamote people
People from Matiari District
Members of the Senate of Pakistan